The Eight of Swords, first published in February 1934, is a detective story by American writer John Dickson Carr, featuring his series detective Gideon Fell.  It is a mystery novel of the type known as a whodunnit.

Plot summary

Mr. Septimus Depping is found dead in his Gloucestershire country house, shot with his own gun and holding a card from the Tarot deck, the eight of Swords, which stands for "condemning justice".  Among those present is an Anglican bishop who is an expert in criminology, and sees wanted criminals in every parlourmaid, and Henry Morgan, who writes exciting mystery novels under two different names.  Mr. Depping turns out to have been an American criminal, and Gideon Fell must penetrate the secrets of his American associates as well as his British life in retirement in order to bring home the crime to the unlikely criminal.

1934 American novels
Novels by John Dickson Carr
Novels set in Gloucestershire
Hamish Hamilton books
Harper & Brothers books